Corina Chiriac (born 26 October 1949) is a Romanian singer, composer, lyricist, television director and actress. She was one of the most successful Romanian singers of the 1970s and 1980s.

So far she has recorded over 500 songs and performed in many Romanian TV variety shows. She toured Eastern Europe extensively during the 70s and early 80s (the former East Germany, Russia, Bulgaria, Poland, the former Czechoslovakia etc.). She graduated from the National Theatre Institute in 1972. She is the daughter of Romanian composer Mircea Chiriac (1919–1994).

Between 1988 and 1994 she lived in the US. For being very popular in Romania, she received an offer from Walt Disney Pictures, and provides the voice of Ursula in 1994 , 2005 and Morgana in 2010 for the Romanian version of the film, The Little Mermaid and The Little Mermaid 2.

Filmography

References

External links
 

1949 births
Musicians from Bucharest
Romanian women singers
Romanian composers
Living people